The Lucent Public License is an open-source license created by Lucent Technologies. It has been released in two versions: Version 1.0 and 1.02.

While the Lucent Public License is not one of the more popular open-source licenses, a number of products have been released under it.  Notably, the license was the only open source license available to the public for the Plan 9 from Bell Labs operating system until 2014, when the University of California, Berkeley was "authorised by Alcatel-Lucent to release all Plan 9 software previously governed by the Lucent Public License, Version 1.02 under the GNU General Public License, Version 2."

The license has been approved by the Open Source Initiative as a license meeting The Open Source Definition, while the Free Software Foundation considers it a free software license, but suggests to eschew use of the license, stating:
“This is a free software license, but it is incompatible with the GNU GPL because of its choice of law clause. We recommend that you not use this license for new software that you write, but it is ok to use and improve Plan 9 under this license.”
The clause in particular that causes it to be incompatible with the GNU GPL is "This Agreement is governed by the laws of the State of New York and the intellectual property laws of the United States of America."

References

External links
 Lucent Public License Version 1.0
 Lucent Public License Version 1.02

Free and open-source software licenses